Askival is the highest mountain on the island of Rùm, in the Inner Hebrides of Scotland. It is part of the Rùm Cuillin, a rocky range of hills in the southern end of Rùm. It is often climbed as part of a full traverse of the ridge.

References

External links

Computer generated summit panoramas North South index

Marilyns of Scotland
Corbetts
Mountains and hills of the Scottish islands
Mountains and hills of Highland (council area)
Rùm